Dam Ab (also Romanized as Dam Āb and Dam-e Āb) is a village in Haparu Rural District, in the Central District of Bagh-e Malek County, Khuzestan Province, Iran. At the 2006 census, its population was 596, in 111 families.

References 

Populated places in Bagh-e Malek County